Cumberland is an unincorporated community in Marshall County, Oklahoma, United States. It is approximately 12 miles east of Madill. 

A post office was established at Cumberland, Indian Territory on March 31, 1894. It was named for Cumberland Presbyterian Church, an organization active in local mission work.

At the time of its founding, Cumberland was located in Pickens County, Chickasaw Nation.

Cumberland Cove (now known as Texoma Shores Resort) is the community's main tourism driver, where fishing and swimming are the primary activities of interest.

References

External links
 
 

Unincorporated communities in Marshall County, Oklahoma
Unincorporated communities in Oklahoma